Old Hindi was the earliest stage of the Delhi dialect (Khariboli) of the Hindustani language, and so the ancestor of Modern Hindi and Modern Urdu. It developed from Shauraseni Prakrit and was spoken by the peoples of the Hindi Belt, especially around Delhi, in roughly the 13th–15th centuries. It is attested in only a handful of works of literature, including some works by the poet Amir Khusrau, verses by the poet-saint Namdev, and some verses by the Sufi saint Baba Farid in the Adi Granth. The works of Kabir also may be included, as they use a Khariboli-like dialect. Old Hindi was originally written in Devanagari and later in the Perso-Arabic script as well.

Some scholars include Apabhraṃśa poetry as early as 769 AD (Dohakosh by Siddha Sarahapad) within Old Hindi, but this is not generally accepted.

With loanwords from Persian being added to Old Hindi's Prakritic base, the language evolved into Hindustani, which further developed into the present day modern languages of Hindi and Urdu.

References

Notes

Citations

Further reading
 

Languages attested from the 13th century
Languages extinct in the 15th century
Hindi languages
Indo-Aryan languages
Hindi